Along with the release of the 3-episode OVA, Super Robot Wars Original Generation: The Animation, Banpresto also produced a three-volume series of audio drama CDs entitled Super Robot Wars Original Generation: The Sound Cinema. Besides short omake segments, the Sound Cinemas introduced a new sub-plot to the anime. Featured within this side-story were mecha, such as the Astelion AX and the Mironga, which are included in Super Robot Wars: Original Generations. 

After the release of the Sound Cinema, its new material was combined with that of the OVA into a whole new storyline, with slight changes, such as the retconning of the ATX Team mission to Dalian. This was retold in the form of a serialized manga, courtesy of Seta Noriyasu.

Plot

The side-story begins at about the same time as episode one of the OVA. In the clear, full moon night, the Valsione arrives at the Tesla Leicht Institute. Nearby, the pilot of a dark-colored mech spies her arrival. Asking the mechanics to give her machine a tune-up, Lune Zoldark notes the Astelion is also here, but looks to be heavily damaged for some reason. In a nearby lounge, the Astelion's pilot Ibis Douglas can't seem to get her recent encounter out of her mind. She and co-pilot Tsugumi Takakura were out on a test flight of the improved Astelion AX when they were suddenly attacked and nearly disabled by a machine they had never seen before. After each girl explains their respective situation, Tsugumi enters and introduces new assistant Diane Uddo, an expert computer engineer. Diane asks Lune if she can work on the Valsione's computer systems while it is being repaired; Lune agrees. Just as Diane is finishing her work, she notices mechanics shouting about how the Bartools at the exhibition suddenly attacks the Earth Federation forces and the crowd gathered at the unveiling ceremony. At the same time, a young man named Kyle Bean gives the order to attack, and his Mironga squadron launches towards the institute.

Tsugumi contacts Major Gilliam Yeager aboard the Hagane battleship, to report at his behest. Having searched their database for anything regarding the AMN System, Tsugumi has come up with a short file on the Mironga, the machine that attacked the Astelion AX. Gilliam only has enough time to remark at the Bartool's prototype, before the data is mysteriously erased and the transmission cut off. Meanwhile, Tesla Leicht is rocked by explosions. Asking what happened from nearby control staff, Tsugumi is informed the Institute's observation and self-defense systems suddenly encountered errors and went offline: they have been hacked. Ibis recognizes the incoming mecha, but Lune insists she faces them while the Astelion AX is still being repaired. The Valsione's conventional attacks are easily evaded by the unusually speedy Mirongas, and Lune resolves to use the Valsione's "Psycho Blaster" to try and take out as many as she can at once, until her machine halts in mid-air. Swift attacks from the surrounding Mirongas send the Valsione tumbling to the ground. Kyle points his Mironga's gun at the downed Valsione, explaining she has no chance because of the virus in her mech's computer.

Kyle announces to the whole of Tesla Leicht's staff they will be rounded up to supplement the Omni Dendro Encephalon System (ODE System), but is interrupted as Diane calls out his name, yelling at him to stop. Recognizing her voice, Kyle tells Selcia not to interfere, and before she can explain, a small group of Mirongas above Kyle's position are instantly destroyed. Its attacker is none other than the Cybuster. Before returning to the surface world of La Gias, its pilot Masaki Andoh had received a cryptic piece of advice from his nemesis Shu Shirakawa, pointing him towards Tesla Leicht. The Cybuster's speed proves to be too much for the Mirongas until Kyle engages him, even shooting a nearby ally, hoping to damage the Cybuster. Kyle tells an angered Masaki that small losses are nothing when counted towards the fulfillment of Professor Wilheim von Juergen's ambition. Diane explains the specifics of Juergen's plan to Ibis and Tsugumi before dashing out. Running to the battlefield, Diane implores Lune to let her repair the sabotaged Valsione, but a pair of Mirongas return to destroy the mech. A pilot informs Kyle that Selcia is in the line of fire, but Kyle orders them to attack anyway. Diane is caught in an explosion, but suffers only minor injuries, thanks to Lune and the timely intervention of Ibis in the not-quite-repaired Astelion AX.

As Lune helps her up, Selcia explains herself: Diane Uddo was the name of her friend who had perished in the same attack that took Juergen's loved ones from him. Selcia had assumed the name of her deceased friend, in order to be a mole at Tesla Leicht, planting the viruses in both the Institute's and the Valsione's computers, in anticipation for Kyle's attack. However, seeing Kyle's unnerving ferocity and the violent Bartool revolt made her realize this will result in more casualties, something she cannot bear. As the Cybuster and Astelion AX battle the remaining Mirongas, Selcia removes the virus from the Valsione. An attack disarms the Cybuster, but the Valsione makes its move and uses its Psycho Blaster attack to take out the remaining Mirongas, save Kyle's. He presses his attack, his abilities somehow more skilled than before. It seems the AMN System was merely a Trojan Horse for the ODE System, which violently takes control of Kyle's mind and body. Just as this happens, a giant sword pierces the side of Kyle's Mironga. Shu Shirakawa makes his entrance in the Granzon.

Shu retrieves the weapon, just before Kyle attempts a counterattack, demanding Shu his reasons for being here. As the Granzon deflects the Mironga's blades, Shu explains the data he had gleaned from his time at the Extra-Over Technological Investigative Institute (EOTI Institute) had pointed him towards Juergen's recent actions. Shu knew Juergen would eventually target him to supply the ODE System with his intellect, however Shu would not allow anyone to rob him of his free will, and decided to take care of this small part of the conflict himself. Shu activates the Granzon's "Graviton Cannon", which grounds Kyle's Mironga and begins to crush it. Kyle sees Selcia on his monitor and attempts one last desperate attack against the Granzon, but his Mironga breaks up completely, killing Kyle. As the dust clears, the Granzon has disappeared, but Shu once again hints to Masaki as to how he should proceed.

Super Robot Wars Original Generation: The Sound Cinema